This article features the results of the national football team of the Irish Free State between 1924 and 1935. The team, now the Republic of Ireland national football team, was selected by the Football Association of Ireland.

1924
The exact status of these four internationals played in 1924 is unclear. The 1924 FAI annual report, regarded them as full internationals, despite featuring entirely amateur teams.
In June 1999 both FIFA and the IFFHS also declared that between 1908 and 1956 every game at the Olympic football tournaments was a full international.

According to Rsssf, all four opponents that the Irish Free State played also regard these games as full internationals.

1925

1926

1927

1928

1929

1930

1931

1932

1933

1934

1935

References

See also
Ireland national football team (FAI) - Results

1920s
Irish Free State
Foo
Foo
1923–24 in Irish association football
1924–25 in Irish association football
1925–26 in Irish association football
1926–27 in Irish association football
1927–28 in Irish association football
1928–29 in Irish association football
1929–30 in Irish association football
1930–31 in Irish association football
1931–32 in Irish association football
1932–33 in Irish association football
1933–34 in Irish association football
1934–35 in Irish association football
1935–36 in Irish association football